Arnold Rushambwa (born March 1, 1982) was a Zimbabwean cricketer. He was a right-handed batsman and a right-arm medium-fast bowler who played for CFX Academy. He was born in Harare.

Rushambwa made three appearances for the team during the Logan Cup competition of 2001-02. Following an unsteady start, in which, in the second innings of his debut match, he made a duck, he was pushed down to the tailend in the batting lineup, where he played his final two games of the competition.

Rushambwa took two wickets with the ball, bowling eighteen overs. He is brother to  Munyaradzi Rushambwa, Tinashe Rushambwa and Kudakwashe Rushambwa.

External links
Arnold Rushambwa at Cricket Archive 

1982 births
Living people
Zimbabwean cricketers
CFX Academy cricketers